Ying was a minor kingdom in eastern China that existed from circa 1030 BCE to 646 BCE. Sometime after its establishment it became a vassal state of the Western Zhou, which extended into the Spring and Autumn period. Ying briefly became a vassal state of Chu in the early-600s BCE, but was annexed by the Chu in 646 BCE. Ying was in modern-day Pingdingshan, Henan province, where many artifacts from the state have been unearthed.

History
The state of Ying was founded around 1030 BCE by Ying Hou, a younger brother of King Cheng of Zhou.

Partial list of rulers 

 1. Ying Hou (應侯) younger brother of King Cheng of Zhou
 2. Ying Hou Xiangong (應侯見工), son of Ying Hou

(Unknown intermediary king[s])

 Ying Ligong (or Xigong, 應釐公)

(Unknown intermediary king[s])

 Ying Houcheng (應侯爯)

(Unknown later king[s])

See also
Warring States period

References

Further reading 
 Liu, Yuan (Spring 2005). "读《西周封国考疑》" [Commentary on Verifying Western Zhou Vassals]. Chinese Historical Research Trends (in Chinese): 28–29
Ying, Weiqiang 古应国文明史 [Ancient History of the Ying Civilization]. (in Chinese)

Ancient Chinese states